Must lind (Black bird) is a compilation album by Estonian rock band Ruja.

It was released after the tragedy of M/S Estonia, where the band's lead singer Urmas Alender died and is dedicated to him.

Track listing
"Must lind" (Black bird) (Rein Rannap/Karl Eduard Sööt)
"Teisel pool vett" (On the other side of the water) (Urmas Alender)
"Mida teeksid siis" (What would you do then) (Alender, Igor Garšnek, Jaanus Nõgisto/Alender)
"Tulekell" (Fire clock) (Garšnek/Alender)
"Ei mullast..." (Not from the ground...) (Margus Kappel/Hando Runnel)
"Ajaloo õppetund" (A lesson in history) (Nõgisto/Juhan Viiding)
"Mida me räägime teistest" (What we talk about others) (Rannap/Ott Arder)
"Rävala rock" (Rannap/Arder)
"Omaette" (By itself) (Nõgisto/Viiding)
"Eleegia" (Elegy) (Alender)
"Üle müüri" (Over the wall) (Nõgisto/Viiding)
"Ha, ha, ha, ha" (Nõgisto/Viiding)
"Eile nägin ma Eestimaad" (Yesterday I saw Estonia) (Rannap/Arder)
"Murtud lilled" (Broken flowers) (Garšnek/Runnel)
"Veerev kivi" (Rolling stone) (Nõgisto/Vladislav Koržets)
"Vaiki kui võid" (Be silent if you may) (Alender)
"Läänemere lained" (Waves of the Baltic Sea) (Nõgisto/Juhan Liiv)
"Luigelaul" (Swan song) (Garšnek/Alender)
"Nii vaikseks kõik on jäänud" (It has become all so quiet) (Rannap/Ernst Enno)

References

Ruja albums
1994 compilation albums
Estonian-language albums